Dalibor Řehák (born 11 September 1955) is a Czech weightlifter. He competed in the men's middle heavyweight event at the 1980 Summer Olympics.

References

External links
 

1955 births
Living people
Czech male weightlifters
Olympic weightlifters of Czechoslovakia
Weightlifters at the 1980 Summer Olympics
People from Příbor
Sportspeople from the Moravian-Silesian Region